Illinois Route 6 is a 4-lane freeway entirely in Peoria County in central Illinois. It begins as a northern extension of Interstate 474 at Interstate 74 west of Peoria, and ends at Illinois Route 29 at the 9th Mile in Mossville, south of Chillicothe.

Route description 
Although fairly short, Illinois 6 draws more traffic than a rural highway because it passes through the developing north and northwest edge of Peoria.  A  stretch of road around the U.S. Route 150 (War Memorial Drive) exit has become a major commercial development area that now includes a major mall and a nearby strip mall with over 30 movie screens between them.  In addition, new development is occurring rapidly around the other interchanges of Allen Road (old Illinois Route 174), Knoxville Avenue (Illinois Route 40), and Illinois Route 29.

History 
SBI Route 6 initially ran from Fulton to Chicago. It roughly followed present-day US 30, Illinois Route 38, and Roosevelt Road. In 1935, IL 6 was decommissioned and was replaced with a portion of US 330 (now IL 38/Roosevelt Road) and US 30.

The Illinois Route 6 designation remained decommissioned until the early 1980s when the present freeway north of Peoria was finished. By 1988, the freeway was extended to Illinois Route 29 near Mossville.

Future
Several plans have been considered for continuing the Illinois 6 corridor. One is extending Illinois 6 into a loop by building a bridge over the Illinois River and running the highway south to Interstates 74 and 474 near Interstate 155 in Morton. 

In 2013, Illinois Governor Pat Quinn proposed a $12.3 billion road plan that earmarked funds for engineering work and corridor studies, renewing interest in connecting Route 6 with I-74.

Exit list

References

Freeways in the United States
006
Transportation in Peoria County, Illinois
Year of establishment missing
U.S. Route 30